Sisante is a municipality located in the Cuenca Province, Castile-La Mancha, Spain. According to the 2004 census (INE), the municipality has a population of 1,795 inhabitants.

References

Municipalities in the Province of Cuenca